Niu Zhizhong (born March 1955) a former officer in the People's Armed Police of China.  At the height of his career, he served as deputy commander of the People's Armed Police. He was an alternate member of the 18th CPC Central Committee. He was expelled from the Communist Party in 2016.

Biography
Niu was born in Laoting County, Hebei in March 1955. He joined the People's Liberation Army in December 1970. He worked in the 38th Army for a long time. In 1996, he was transferred to the People's Armed Police. He then continued working in the People's Armed Police, holding positions as division commander of the 4th Division, chief commander of Tibet Armed Police Corps, and chief commander of Guangdong Armed Police Corps. In 2007 he became deputy chief of staff of the People's Armed Police, rising to chief of staff in 2009. In 2015 he was promoted to deputy commander of the People's Armed Police.

Niu became an alternate member of the 18th Central Committee of the Chinese Communist Party in 2012. On October 27, 2016, Niu was expelled from the Chinese Communist Party at the 6th Plenary Session of the 18th Central Committee of the Chinese Communist Party.

References

External links

1955 births
People from Tangshan
Living people
People's Liberation Army generals from Hebei
Expelled members of the Chinese Communist Party
Alternate members of the 18th Central Committee of the Chinese Communist Party